The 2005 FIA GT RAC Brno Supercar 500 was the fifth race for the 2005 FIA GT Championship season.  It took place on 29 June 2005 at Brno.

Official results

Class winners in bold.  Cars failing to complete 70% of winner's distance marked as Not Classified (NC).

Statistics
 Pole Position – #16 JMB Racing – 1:56.322
 Fastest Lap – #66 GruppeM Racing – 2:04.481
 Average Speed – 148.11 km/h

External links
 Official Results
 Race result

B